Jānis Bērziņš (born May 4, 1993) is a Latvian professional basketball player for Legia Warszawa of the Polish Basketball League. Standing at 2.01 m (6 ft 7 in) he plays at the small forward position.

Professional career
Jānis Bērziņš who in childhood was raised in Latvian most northern town Rūjiena started his professional career in 2009 with BK Valmiera. He played there for two seasons until he joined VEF Rīga, signing a multiyear contract. After his first season with VEF he was loaned back to Valmiera. Bērziņš had very successful 2012–2013 campaign. First he played major role for Valmiera, that won Latvian League bronze medals, which was followed by invitation to participate in Adidas Eurocamp, which was held in Treviso, Italy.

In August 2013, after an impressive showing with Latvian team in U20 European Championship, Bērziņš signed an extension with VEF Rīga. He also had contract offer from Spanish powerhouse Barcelona, but instead chose Riga as best place for his development.

On July 2, 2020, he has signed with Stelmet Zielona Góra of the Polish League.

On July 16, 2021, he signed with Baxi Manresa of the Spanish Liga ACB.

On January 14, 2022, Berzins moved to Larisa of the Greek Basket League. In 25 league games, he averaged 5.7 points, 3.4 rebounds and 1 assist, playing around 18 minutes per contest.

On July 14, 2022, he has signed with Legia Warszawa of the Polish Basketball League.

Latvian National Team
Jānis has played for Latvian U16, U18 and U20 National Team as well as Senior National Team. In July 2013, Bērziņš was big part of Latvia's historic run at U20 European Championship in Tallinn, Estonia, which was highlighted by making finals, while Jānis was named to All-Tournament team.

References

External links
Eurobasket Profile

1993 births
Living people
Basket Zielona Góra players
Bàsquet Manresa players
BK Valmiera players
BK VEF Rīga players
BK Ventspils players
Latvian men's basketball players
Larisa B.C. players
Lega Basket Serie A players
Legia Warsaw (basketball) players
Liga ACB players
Orlandina Basket players
People from Valmiera
People from Rūjiena
Small forwards